Mastobunus is a genus of harvestmen in the family Sclerosomatidae from Southern Europe and North Africa.

Species
 Mastobunus ignotus A. Perera, 1990
 Mastobunus tuberculifer (Lucas, 1846)

References

Harvestmen
Harvestman genera